Suzanne Caubet (September 27, 1898 – June 1980), also known as Suzanne Caubaye, was a French actress, singer, and writer.

Early life
Suzanne Caubet was born in Lévignac to French parents. She was raised in Paris, and knew her godmother Sarah Bernhardt through her father Prospere Caubet and uncle, Georges Deneubourg, both actors. She was a child actor and traveled with Bernhardt's company to the United States, where Caubet stayed after 1919.

Career
Caubet was based in New York as an actress. "Miss Caudet has the distinct advantage of being a striking brunette," the New York Times observed of her appearance in 1919. She appeared on Broadway in Du Theatre au Champ D'Honneur (1917), Easy Terms (1925), The Squall (1926-1927), Ringside (1928), Seven (1929-1930), The Plutocrat (1930), Dancing Partner (1930), The Great Barrington (1931), Angeline Moves In (1932), Singapore (1932), The Monster (1933), Another Love (1934), Broadway Interlude (1934), Symphony (1935), American Holiday (1936), Claudia (1942), It's a Gift (1945), and Mid-Summer (1953).

In 1955 she appeared in "The File Clerk", an episode of the television anthology series I Spy.

Writing
Caubet wrote a play with Anne Partridge, Our Sarah (1945), about Sarah Bernhardt, and comedies Riri (1929, with Daniel Auschitzky), and Just You, Madame (1932). She also adapted Daniel Auschitzky's Hide and Seek (1929). Under the pseudonym "Jeanne Caubannes" she wrote Ranah (1928) with Wood Soanes.

Other activities
In 1938 Caubet was teaching in the drama department at Marymount College and directing a Christmas pageant at the school. In 1942, she served as a French language specialist for the wartime Postal Censorship Office, while also appearing in a Broadway show.

Personal life
Suzanne Caubet married actor and playwright Crane Wilbur in 1922. They divorced in 1928. She died in 1980, aged 81 years, at the Actors' Fund Home in Englewood, New Jersey. Her papers are archived in the New York Public Library's Billy Rose Theatre Division.

References

External links
 A 1919 Sarony photograph of Suzanne Caubet, in the collection of the Wisconsin Historical Society.
 A 1930 White Studio portrait of Suzanne Caubaye, in the collection of the Museum of the City of New York.
 
 
 

1898 births
1980 deaths
French women singers
French actresses
French women writers
20th-century French women